Gordon Dennis (18 April 1919 – 10 March 1998) was an  Australian rules footballer who played with Fitzroy in the Victorian Football League (VFL).

Notes

External links 

1919 births
1998 deaths
Australian rules footballers from Victoria (Australia)
Fitzroy Football Club players